Marie-José Benhalassa (22 April 1940 – 10 October 2019), known professionally as Marie-José Nat, was a French actress. Among her notable works in cinema were the sequel films Anatomy of a Marriage: My Days with Jean-Marc and Anatomy of a Marriage: My Days with Françoise (1963), directed by André Cayatte. In 1974, she received a Cannes Film Festival Award for Best Actress for her performance in the film Violins at the Ball.

Early life and family 
Benhalassa was born in Bonifacio, Corse-du-Sud, to a Kabyle Berber father, Abdelkader Benhalassa, and a Corsican mother, Vincentine (Biancarelli).

In 1960, she married the actor Roger Dumas and divorced him in 1962. She then married French director Michel Drach with whom she had three sons, David, Julien and Aurélien. They divorced in 1981. She had a relationship of several years with the actor Victor Lanoux. On 30 September 2005 she married the painter, writer and songwriter Serge Rezvani in her third marriage.

She died in Paris of cancer at age 79.

Training 

Career

Marie-José Benhalassa 
Benhalassa began her career as a cover-girl and haute-couture model. In 1955, she won a competition from the magazine Femmes d'aujourd'hui which allowed her to become Jean-Claude Pascal's partner in a photo comics entitled L'amour est un songe.

Marie-José Nat 
Denys de La Patellière offered her her first major role in 1959 in Rue des prairies alongside Jean Gabin, in which she played his daughter. The following year, she performed in a comedy sketch by René Clair alongside Claude Rich and Yves Robert, and obtained a major role in La Vérité by Henri-Georges Clouzot, playing Brigitte Bardot's rival opposite Sami Frey.

In 1965, she married filmmaker Michel Drach; they had three children and divorced in 1981. She starred in several of her husband's films: Amelie or The Time to Love (1961), Elise, or Real Life (1970) and Les violons du bal (1974), inspired by his childhood experiences during World War II. She was also known for Train of Life (1998), Litan (1982) and The Dacians (1966) with Jean Sorel, Jean-Louis Trintignant, Victor Lanoux and Bernadette Lafont as acting partners.

In 2001, Nat was a member of the jury at the 36th Karlovy Vary International Film Festival in 2001, and at the 24th Cabourg Film Festival in 2010. 

She was the very first person to appear on the front cover of Télé 7 Jours in its current name on March 26, 1960.

Awards and honours 
Nat was awarded Best Actress at the 1974 Cannes Film Festival for her performance in Violins at the Ball, and the film was nominated for the Golden Palm award.

She was made a chevalier of the Légion d'honneur on 31 December 2004, chevalier of the Ordre national du Mérite on 18 November 2002 and promoted to the rank of officer on 14 November 2011, commandeur of the Ordre des Arts et des Lettres as a member of the conseil de l'ordre of which she was a member from 1 March 2001 until April 2012

Roles

Theatre 
 1958: Virage dangereux by John Boynton Priestley, directed by Raymond Rouleau, Théâtre Michel
 1966: Médor by Roger Vitrac, directed by Maurice Jacquemont, with Bernard Noël, studio des Champs-Élysées
 1984: Désiré by Sacha Guitry, directed by Jean-Claude Brialy, with Jean-Claude Brialy an Bernadette Lafont, Théâtre Édouard VII
 1985: Voisin voisine after Jerome Chodorov directed by Pierre Mondy, with Victor Lanoux, Théâtre du Palais-Royal, then in 1986 at Théâtre Montansier
 1990: Avec ou sans arbres by Jeannine Worms, directed by Albert-André Lheureux, with Henri Garcin, Théâtre Hébertot

Film 
Among her notable works in cinema were the sequel films Anatomy of a Marriage: My Days with Jean-Marc and Anatomy of a Marriage: My Days with Françoise (1963), directed by André Cayatte.

 Crime and Punishment (1956) - La jeune fille du bal (uncredited)
 Women's Club (1956)
 Donnez-moi ma chance (1957) - Rosine
 Arènes joyeuses (1958) - Violette
 Vous n'avez rien à déclarer? (1959) - Lise
 Secret professionnel (1959) - Elvire
 Rue des prairies (1959) - Odette Neveux
 Vive le duc! (1960) - Cécile
 Love and the Frenchwoman (1960) - The bride (segment "Mariage, Le")
 The Truth (1960) - Annie Marceau
 The Menace (1961) - Josépha
 Amelie or The Time to Love (1961) - Amélie
 The Seven Deadly Sins (1962) - La jeune femme (segment "Colère, La")
 Sentimental Education (1962) - Anne Arnoux
 Anatomy of a Marriage: My Days with Jean-Marc (1964) - Françoise Dubreuil
 Anatomy of a Marriage: My Days with Françoise (1964) - Françoise Dubreuil
 La bonne occase (1965) - Béatrice
 A Woman in White (1965) - Claude Sauvage
 Dacii (1966) - Meda - Decebalus' Daughter
 Diamond Safari (1966) - Electre
 Mon amour, mon amour (1967) - Minor Role (uncredited)
 Le Paria (1969) - Lucia
 L'Opium et le Bâton (1969) - Farroudja
 Elise, or Real Life (1970) - Elise Le Tellier
 Embassy (1972) - Laure
 Kruiswegstraat 6 (1973) - Françoise Verbrugge
 Violins at the Ball (1974) - Elle (La femme et la mère de Michel) / Michel's wife
 Dis-moi que tu m'aimes (1974) - Charlotte Le Royer
 The Simple Past (1977) - Cécile
 La disubbidienza (1981) - Mrs. Manzi
 Anna (1981) - Anna
 Litan (1982) - Nora
 Black River (1991) - Mme Ginette
 Le nombril du monde (1993) - Oumi
 La nuit du destin (1997) - Mme Slimani
 Train of Life (1998) - Sura
 Colette, une femme libre (2004, TV Mini-Series) - Sido
 Le cadeau d'Elena (2004) - Elena

Nat also worked extensively in television series and dramas.

References

External links 

Marie-José Nat, at Allmovie

1940 births
2019 deaths
People from Corse-du-Sud
Cannes Film Festival Award for Best Actress winners
French film actresses
French television actresses
French people of Algerian descent
French people of Kabyle descent
French people of Corsican descent
20th-century French actresses
Chevaliers of the Légion d'honneur
Officers of the Ordre national du Mérite
Commandeurs of the Ordre des Arts et des Lettres
Deaths from cancer in France